Virginia, la monaca di Monza (i.e. "Virginia, the nun of Monza") is a 2004 Italian-Spanish television movie directed by Alberto Sironi and starring Giovanna Mezzogiorno.  The film is loosely based on real life events of Marianna de Leyva, better known as "The Nun of Monza", whose story was made  famous by the Alessandro Manzoni's novel The Betrothed.

Plot

Cast 

 Giovanna Mezzogiorno as  Virginia Maria de Leyva
 Stefano Dionisi as Paolo Osio
 Lluís Homar as Father Castells
 Xabier Elorriaga as Cardinal Borromeo
 Delia Boccardo as Virginia's Mother
 Toni Bertorelli as Don Martino
 Quim Gutiérrez as Carles
 Cristiana Capotondi as Marianna Aliprandi
 Renato Scarpa as Monsignor Ripamonti 
  Pia Lanciotti  as Mare Abadessa
 Bea Segura as Clara
  Biancamaria D'Amato  as Sister Benedetta
  Nicoletta Bertorelli  as Sister Candida
  Giacinto Ferro  as Joaquim Nunes
 Marco Foschi as Duke Grimani
  Laura Pasetti  as Sister Francesca
 Serena Rossi as Angelica

References

External links

2004 television films
2004 films
Italian television films
2004 biographical drama films
Films set in Italy
Italian biographical drama films
Films about religion
Cultural depictions of Italian women